The Constitution of 1782 was a group of Acts passed by the Parliament of Ireland and the Parliament of Great Britain in 1782–83 which increased the legislative and judicial independence of the Kingdom of Ireland by reducing the ability of the Kingdom of Great Britain to make laws and hear court cases relating to Ireland. These changes were promoted, under the name legislative independence, by the Irish Patriot Party, a loose alliance with Henry Grattan as its leading orator. The Parliament of Ireland as it existed after 1782 is often called Grattan's Parliament in his honour. The Constitution did not create a responsible executive, as the Dublin Castle administration remained under the control of a Lord Lieutenant sent over by the British government.

Under the terms of Poynings' Law of 1495, no law could be passed that was not first approved by the Parliament of England: "An Act that no Parliament be holden in this Land until the Acts be certified into England". The parliament was established by and subordinate to the Crown of England. Along with other restrictions, it meant in effect, that the Lord Lieutenant of Ireland had control over the parliamentary agenda and authority to restrict its ability to legislate contrary to the objectives of the British government in London.

From 1782, Grattan — the leader of the Patriot Party — led a series of legal changes which produced a period of novel legislative freedom. The main act was the Repeal of Act for Securing Dependence of Ireland Act 1782. This act repealed the Declaratory Act of 1719. The 1719 Act had declared that the Parliament of Ireland was dependent on the Parliament of Great Britain and the Privy Council of Great Britain.

The British Rockingham Ministry had conceded the act in fear of an American-style revolt. This concession was followed by the Irish Appeals Act 1783, commonly known as the Renunciation Act. By the terms of this act, the Parliament of Great Britain renounced all right to legislate for Ireland, and declared that no appeal from the decision of any court in Ireland could be heard in any court in Great Britain.

Grattan's Parliament also achieved greater control over the Royal Irish Army.

The new constitutional arrangements proved short-lived in consequence of the 1798 uprising by the United Irishmen. By the Acts of Union the Parliament of Ireland was abolished. The Kingdom of Ireland was absorbed into the new United Kingdom of Great Britain and Ireland, with effect from 1 January 1801.

See also
 Irish House of Commons
 Irish House of Lords

References

External links
 "The Constitution of 1782" in Bartlett, Thomas.  Ireland:  A History. Cambridge:  Cambridge University Press, 2010.  

1782 in law
1782 in Ireland
Irish constitutional law